Rich Man, Poor Man is a lost 1918 American silent romantic drama film starring Marguerite Clark and directed by J. Searle Dawley. It is based on a 1916 Broadway play by George Broadhurst. It was produced by Famous Players-Lasky and distributed by Paramount Pictures.

Plot
As described in a film magazine, following the death of her mother, Betty Wynne (Clark) becomes the drudge of the boarding house until one of her friends introduces her as the missing grandchild of John K. Beeston (Warde). When the deception is discovered, Betty has made such an impression Beeston that he insists that she remain, and since the man she loves is the real missing heir, she quite readily consents to becoming a member of the household.

Cast
Marguerite Clark as Betty Wynne
Richard Barthelmess as Bayard Varick
George Backus as Henry Mapelson
Frederick Warde as John K. Beeston
 J. W. Herbert as De Courcey Lloyd
Augusta Anderson as Mrs. De Courcey Lloyd
William Wadsworth as Henry Evans
Ottola Nesmith as Mrs. Wynne
 Mary Davis as Mrs. Tilney
Winter Hall

References

External links

AllMovie.com

1918 films
American silent feature films
Films directed by J. Searle Dawley
Lost American films
Paramount Pictures films
American films based on plays
1918 romantic drama films
American romantic drama films
American black-and-white films
1910s American films
Silent romantic drama films
Silent American drama films